John Worth may refer to:

John M. Worth (died 1900), North Carolina politician
John Worth (Chippenham MP), Member of Parliament for Chippenham
John Worth (Tiverton MP), Member of Parliament for Tiverton
John Worth (priest) (died 1688), Irish Anglican Dean
Les Vandyke (1931–2021), singer who used the pseudonym John Worth
John Worth, character in Angel and the Badman